Noonday Dream is the third album by British singer-songwriter Ben Howard, released on 1 June 2018.

Critical reception

"Noonday Dream" has received generally favorable reviews from critics. At Metacritic, which assigns a normalized rating out of 100 to reviews from mainstream publications, the album received an average score of 80 based on 11 reviews. In a perfect review, Roisin O'Connor of The Independent says that "On [Noonday Dream], Howard expands the Cornish landscape that has impacted his previous work and brings in sounds and instruments that spark the imagination to places further afield, in the most exquisite way. Opener 'Nica Libres at Dusk' is a walk in shimmering heat, dust kicked from underfoot, with Howard’s voice singing dirge-like on the verses then drawn sweetly out like smoke from the cigars on the chorus; somehow evoking the soaring eagles depicted in the lyrics through a high whine on the electric guitar. 'The Defeat' features what sounds like a didgeridoo that thrums low beneath the clash of symbols and Howard’s lyrics contemplating: 'Where does the robber go, where does the robber go to repent?'". Sputnikmusic also gave the album a perfect score, saying that "[Noonday Dream is] Ben Howard doubling down on ambiance, creating a collage of moments both fleeting and everlasting while choosing the art of the craft over the simplest path to accolades. It may take more time to appreciate, but it’s a masterclass of songwriting that will likely dictate the future direction of his music." James Christopher Monger of AllMusic gave the album a 4-star review, saying that "Rolling in like fog on the Atlantic, the aptly named Noonday Dream is an inward-looking and unassuming batch of ambient folk songs that still manages to invoke huge vistas... the over seven-minute 'A Boat to an Island on the Wall,' with its murmuring ambient noises and occasional bursts of background conversation, would almost give off a Final Cut-era Pink Floyd vibe if it weren't so subtle, and the heartfelt and hazy 'Towing the Line' delivers one of Howard's most engaging melodies to date. Noonday Dream can feel ephemeral at times, but never is it unpleasant, even when it's fishing for emotional truth in unstable waters. Introspection rarely feels this inclusive."

Brice Ezell of PopMatters gave the album a rating of 6/10. He says, "As was the case on I Forget Where We Were, Howard strays just far enough from the more straightforward acoustic arrangements of Every Kingdom that the music feels dull and shapeless when it shouldn’t need to be. Dusty deserts give Howard plenty to work with here, but there is a risk of getting stranded out in such parched terrain. For all the times where Noonday Dream gets, well, a little too dreamy, “Nica Libres at Dusk” demonstrates further possibility for Howard’s songwriting. If he’s able to marry his chops with acoustic instruments to his penchant for electronic and ambient music, without letting one take precedence over the other, he’d be on his way to a masterpiece that, at their best, each of his three records thus far has hinted at." NME's Hannah Mylrea gave the album 3 stars, saying that "at times, it’s truly gorgeous; but at others: it’s bloody hard work... Howard’s first two records revealed him to be an extraordinarily talented song-writer, unafraid to make radical musical decisions; but the path he’s followed for Noonday Dream is a disappointing one. Monotonous and self-interested, it’s a disappointing listen from one of Britain’s most interesting song-writers."

Accolades

Commercial Performance
Noonday Dream has sold 42,207 copies in the UK, as of March 2021.

Track listing
All tracks are written by Ben Howard, except where noted.

Personnel
Credits adapted from AllMusic.

Musicians
 Ben Howard – primary artist, guitar, producer
 India Bourne – cello, piano
 Kyle Keegan – drums
 Mickey Smith – guitar
 Richard Thomas – guitar
 Gillian Maguire – viola
 Agatha Lintott – backing vocals
 Owain Davies – backing vocals

Production
 John Cornfield – engineer
 Huntley Miller – mastering
 Chris Elms – mixing
 Roddy Bow – artwork

Charts

Weekly charts

Year-end charts

References

2018 albums
Ben Howard albums
Island Records albums